Boheľov  is a village and municipality in the Dunajská Streda District in the Trnava Region of south-west Slovakia.

History
In the 9th century, the territory of Boheľov became part of the Kingdom of Hungary. After the Austro-Hungarian army disintegrated in November 1918, Czechoslovak troops occupied the area, later acknowledged internationally by the Treaty of Trianon. Between 1938 and 1945 Boheľov once more became part of Miklós Horthy's Hungary through the First Vienna Award. From 1945 until the Velvet Divorce, it was part of Czechoslovakia. Since then it has been part of Slovakia.

See also
 List of municipalities and towns in Slovakia

References

Genealogical resources

The records for genealogical research are available at the state archive "Statny Archiv in Bratislava, Slovakia"
 Roman Catholic church records (births/marriages/deaths): 1713-1905 (parish B)
 Reformated church records (births/marriages/deaths): 1784-1902 (parish B)

External links
Local calvinist parish website 
News on Bögellő 
Local CSEMADOK organization info 
Surnames of living people in Bohelov

Villages and municipalities in Dunajská Streda District
Hungarian communities in Slovakia